Association Sportive Maïka is a football club in Uvira, Democratic Republic of Congo.  They play in the Linafoot Ligue 2, the second level of professional football in DR Congo. 

Uvira
Football clubs in the Democratic Republic of the Congo